The New Carrollton–Silver Spring Line, designated as Route F4, is a daily bus route operated by the Washington Metropolitan Area Transit Authority between New Carrollton station of the Orange Line of the Washington Metro and Silver Spring station of the Red Line of the Washington Metro. The line operates every 12 minutes between 7AM and 9PM, and 30-60 minutes after 9PM. F4 trips are roughly 62 minutes. The line mainly provides service on the East-West Highway corridor from the eastern portion of Prince George's County to Montgomery County.

Background
Route F4 operates daily between New Carrollton station and Silver Spring station connecting both Prince George's County to Montgomery County via the East-West Highway corridor. The route is one of the busiest Metro routes from Maryland as it mainly connects Riverdale, Hyattsville, Lewisdale which sees increased ridership.

Route F4 begins at New Carrollton and travels via Ellin Road, Harkins Road, and Annapolis Road. The route then turns along Riverdale Road travelling along it before westbound trips turn from Riverdale Road onto Lafayette Avenue, then turns onto Queensbury Road, while eastbound trips turns from Queensbury Road onto 48th Avenue, before turning onto Riverdale Road, buses remain along Queensbury Road, operating until reaching Belcrest Road. The route then turns into Hyattsville Crossing station serving the station before turning back along East-West Highway. The route then operates along East-West Highway, then enters Montgomery County by operating along Ethan Allen Avenue. The route then turns along Philadelphia Avenue until it turns along Fenton Street. The route then turns along Colesville Road, then on Georgia Avenue, and then onto Wayne Avenue to serve the second level of the Paul S. Sarbanes Transit Center. The route will operate the same pathway back vice versa.

Route F4 currently operates out of Landover division.

F4 stops

History
Routes F4 & F6 were created as brand new Metrobus routes on February 19, 1978, to replace the segment of the former J2 & J4 streetcar lines between Silver Spring & Beltway Plaza, when Silver Spring station opened. J2 was truncated to only operate between the Silver Spring station & Montgomery Mall only while J4 was truncated to only operate between Silver Spring station & Bethesda, instead of operating all the way to Beltway Plaza 

Route F4 originally only operated between Silver Spring station & New Carrollton (Riverdale Road & Annapolis Road) via Prince Georges Plaza operating on all of J2 & J4 former routing between Silver Spring & Prince Georges Plaza running along Fenton Street, Philadelphia Avenue, East West Highway, and Riverdale Road. On December 3, 1978, F4 was extended along Annapolis Road, Harkins Road, and Ellin Road, to its new terminus at New Carrollton station. 

Route F6 also operated on the former J2 & J4 routing between Prince George's Plaza & Beltway Plaza. F6 also replaced parts of the former F9 Streetcar Line routing on Ager Road between the intersection of East West Highway & Ager Road and the intersection of Ager Road & Hamilton Street, which was also discontinued in 1978. It provided brand new service between The Mall At Prince Georges Plaza & New Carrollton, which was not previously existent at the time. The route was originally known as the, "Prince George's–Silver Spring Line", from February 19, 1978, up until 2007, when the line was renamed the, "New Carrollton-Silver Spring Line".  

On December 11, 1993, F6 was rerouted from Beltway Plaza to New Carrollton station to run alongside route F4. Route F6 was also rerouted to enter and serve College Park–University of Maryland station and routes F4 and F6 were rerouted to also serve Prince George's Plaza station. Service to Beltway Plaza and Greenbelt Center was replaced by extended route C2.

On September 12, 1999, route F6 was extended to Silver Spring station via West Hyattsville station. The route operated along Queens Chapel Road, Hamilton Street and Ager Road to serve West Hyattsville, then follow route F4's routing to Silver Spring along East-West Highway, Ethan Allen Avenue, and Philadelphia Avenue.

On May 15, 2003, the original bus bays inside Prince Georges Plaza mall, were demolished in order to build a new Target store. Routes F4 and F6, along with routes 86, C4, F8, R2, R3, R4 and TheBus 13, 14, 18 have stopped entering and looping inside around the mall.

On September 28, 2008, the former Silver Spring Bus Bay was closed and ultimately demolished so that the new Silver Spring Transit Center could be built. Both routes F4 and F6 terminated at the temporary stop that WMATA placed at a curb, located on the northbound side of the intersection of Wayne Avenue & Colesville Road.

As the result of an accident between a MARC commuter train and two F4 buses on the railroad crossing by Riverdale station on March 27, 2009, route F4 was rerouted to operate along the East West Highway bridge between Queensbury Road and Baltimore Avenue via 49th Avenue, Queensbury Road, Taylor Road, and turning onto East West Highway to prevent another accident from happening on the railroad crossing. Service between Riverdale Road and 49th Avenue plus Queensbury Road and East West Highway were discontinued. Alternative service was replaced by TheBus Route 14 on the weekdays until TheBus 14 discontinued service to Riverdale station in 2019.

In 2010, WMATA proposed to split the F4 and F6 routing into two routes. While the F4 remained the same, the F6 was proposed be rerouted to serve Fort Totten, keeping its routing between the New Carrollton station & intersection of East-West Highway & Riggs Road the same, except route F6 would be rerouted to operate on the Route R3 routing between the intersection of Riggs Road & East-West Highway & Fort Totten along East-West Highway, Riggs Road, Sargent Road. This was proposed in order to reduce redundancy with F4 between Silver Spring station and the East West Highway and Riggs Road intersection. The proposal was brought up again in 2012 with the same similarities.

In May 2012, WMATA announced that route F6 would be rerouted to operate between New Carrollton & Fort Totten station to replace route R3 keeping the same routing between New Carrollton and the East West Highway and Riggs Road intersection but running along route R3 routing to Fort Totten from there. The Route F6 will now operate on R3's former routing between the intersection of Riggs Road & East-West Highway & Fort Totten station beginning on June 17, 2012. Route F4 also began operating every 12-20 minutes during the weekdays and 30 minutes on Sundays as a result of the changes to reduce crowding from F6 riders.

With the Silver Spring Transit Center opening in September, 2015, route F4 was rerouted along Fenton street and Colesville to serve the new transit center. Route F4 was given Bus Bay 223 on Level 2 sharing the Bus Bay with the J4.

During the COVID-19 pandemic, the F4 operated on its Saturday supplemental schedule beginning on March 16, 2020. It however began operating on its Sunday service on March 18, 2020. Weekend service was also reduced to operate every 30 munutes. Its regular service was restored on August 23, 2020.

On March 14, 2021, new short trips between New Carrollton and Prince George's Plaza station were introduced to reduce crowding on its buses.

On September 5, 2021, service was rerouted along Queensbury Road between Baltimore Avenue and 49th Avenue restoring its pre-2009 routing. Service along Baltimore Avenue was eliminated. Service was also increased to operate every 12 minutes daily between 7 a.m. to 9 p.m.

Incidents
 On March 27, 2009, a MARC commuter train struck an F4 bus while it was crossing along the Queensbury Road railroad crossing. The F4 bus (D40LFR 6040) then hit another F4 bus that was turning (Flxible Metro 9731) causing damage to both buses. After the accident, route F4 was rerouted along East West Highway to no longer serve the Queensbury Road railroad crossing and in order to prevent another accident from happening.
 On April 11, 2018, a man armed with a knife attempted to hijack an F4 bus after trying to rob a passenger along Riverdale Road. The driver of the bus pulled over and called emergency help. The man demanded everyone to get off the bus and tried taking off with the bus but was stopped due to an security feature that was equipped during an emergency. A Prince George's County police officer was able to detain the suspect and Metro Transit Police shortly after arrested the suspect. None of the 16 passengers on board or the driver were injured.

References

F4
Orange Line (Washington Metro)
1978 establishments in Washington, D.C.
2012 disestablishments in Washington, D.C.
Transportation in Prince George's County, Maryland